is a Buddhist temple located in the town of Chōnan in Chiba Prefecture, Japan. The temple is also called "Kasamori-dera" using the alternate pronunciation of the Chinese character for temple (tera). Kasamori-ji is temple number 31 in the Bandō Sanjūsankasho, or the circuit of 33 Buddhist temples in Eastern Japan sacred to Goddess Kannon. The Eleven-Faced Kannon of Kasamori-ji is only shown to the public in the years of the Ox and Horse in the 12-year cycle of the Chinese zodiac.

It is part of the Kasamori Tsurumai Prefectural Natural Park.

History 

According to tradition the Tendai monk Saichō (767–822)  visited the area in 784. Saichō carved a statue of the Eleven-Headed Kannon, and installed the statue in a thatched hut structure. Nichiren is said to have frequently prayed at Kasamori-ji, and an image of him in his quarters at the temple exists. Kasamori-ji appears in both an ukiyo-e woodblock print by Hiroshige II (1829–1869) as part of the series One Hundred Views of the Provinces. Additionally, Matsuo Bashō (1644–1694) wrote a haiku about the temple. A marker with the haiku is located in front of the temple gate.

Kannon-dō 

The Kannon-dō hall of Kasamori-ji is the only example of a temple built in the  style; the temple is raised on large stilts on all four sides. The Kannon-dō was built in 1028 by order of the Emperor Go-Ichijō as part of a general revival of the temple. While the other structures of Kasamori-ji have been destroyed by fire three times, the Kannon-dō survived. A document uncovered during a modern repair of the temple indicates that repair work had been previously done to the structure between 1573 and 1596. It is designated an Important Cultural Property of Japan.

Order in Buddhist Pilgrimages 
 Bandō Sanjūsankasho
30 Kōzō-ji　--　31 Kasamori-ji 　--　32 Kiyomizu-dera

Transportation 

Kasamori-ji is open every day of the week, 8:00am – 4:00pm. The Kannon-dō can be closed during rain when the stairs become slippery. The temple is accessible from Mobara Station via the JR East  Sotobō Line. From Mobara Station the temple is reached by Kominato Bus to the Kasamori Kannon stop.

Gallery

References

External links 
 Kasamori-ji 

Religious organizations established in the 8th century
Buddhist temples in Chiba Prefecture
Tendai temples
Chōnan